The following highways are numbered 894:

Canada

United States